The Elephant's Foot is the nickname given to a large mass of corium and other materials formed underneath the Chernobyl Nuclear Power Plant, near Pripyat, Ukraine, during the Chernobyl disaster of April 1986, notable for its extreme radioactivity. Discovered in December of that year, it is located in a maintenance corridor near the remains of Reactor No. 4. It is still an extremely radioactive object, though the danger has decreased over time due to the decay of its radioactive components.

Origin

The Elephant's Foot is a mass of black corium with many layers, externally resembling tree bark and glass. It was formed during the Chernobyl disaster in April 1986 and discovered in December 1986. It is named for its wrinkly appearance, suggestive of the foot of an elephant. It is one small part of a much larger mass that lies beneath Reactor No. 4 of the Chernobyl Nuclear Power Plant. The material making up the Elephant's Foot had burnt through at least  of reinforced concrete, then flowed through pipes and fissures and down a hallway to reach its current location.

Composition
The Elephant's Foot is composed primarily of silicon dioxide, with traces of uranium, titanium, zirconium, magnesium and graphite. The mass is largely homogeneous, though the depolymerized silicate glass contains occasional crystalline grains of zircon. These grains of zircon are not elongated, suggesting a moderate crystallization rate. While uranium dioxide dendrites grew quickly at high temperatures within the lava, the zircon began crystallization during slow cooling of the lava. Despite the distribution of uranium-bearing particles not being uniform, the radioactivity of the mass is evenly distributed. The mass was quite dense and unyielding to a drill mounted on a remote-controlled trolley, but able to be damaged by armor-piercing rounds fired from an AK-47 assault rifle. By June 1998, the outer layers had started turning to dust and the mass had started to crack. In 2021, the mass was described as having a consistency similar to sand.

Lethality
At the time of its discovery, about eight months after formation, radioactivity near the Elephant's Foot was approximately 8,000 to 10,000 roentgens, or 80 to 100 grays per hour, delivering a 50/50 lethal dose of radiation (4.5 grays) within five minutes. Since that time the radiation intensity has declined enough that, in 1996, the Elephant's Foot was visited by the deputy director of the New Safe Confinement Project, Artur Korneyev, who took photographs using an automatic camera and a flashlight to illuminate the otherwise dark room.

See also
Chernobylite
Trinitite

Notes

References

Nuclear accidents and incidents
Chernobyl disaster